FabricLive.36 is a DJ mix album by the electronic band LCD Soundsystem. It was released in 2007 as part of the FabricLive Mix Series.

Track listing
Peter Gordon & Love of Life Orchestra - Beginning of the Heartbreak - Lust/Unlust
Baby Oliver - Primetime (Uptown Express) - Environ
Donald Byrd & 125th St, NYC - Love Has Come Around - Elektra
Instant Funk -  I Got My Mind Made Up - Salsoul
Chic - I Feel Your Love Comin' On - Atlantic
Was (Not Was) - Tell Me That I'm Dreaming - ZE
GQ - Lies (Theo Parrish Ugly Edit #7) - GQ
Mudd - Adventures in Bickett Wood (Layne's Head Stash Re-roll)
Elektrik Dred - Butter Up (Gimme Some Bread) - Sounds of Florida
Lenny Williams - You Got Me Running - Geffen
Daniel Wang - Like Some Dream (I Can't Stop Dreaming) - Daniel Wang
Gichy Dan - Cowboys and Gangsters - ZE
Still Going - Still Going Theme - DFA
City of Women - Tablakone - Sähkö
Babytalk - Keep on Move - Stickydisc
Love Committee - Just as Long as I've Got You - Salsoul
Mouzon's Electric Band - Everybody Get Down - Mouzon
Punkin' Machine - I Need You Tonight - JC
LCD Soundsystem - Hippie Priest Bum-out - DFA/EMI
Junior Bryon - Dance to the Music (Dub) - Vanguard
JT - I Love Music - Vanguard
Jackson Jones - I Feel Good Put Your Pants On - Jackson Jones
NYC Peech Boys - Life Is Something Special - Island Def Jam
Peter Gordon & Love of Life Orchestra - Don't Don't - Lust/Unlust

References

External links
Fabric: FabricLive.36

Fabric (club) albums
LCD Soundsystem albums
2007 compilation albums